Verkhnekumsky is a rural locality (a khutor) in Sovetskoye Rural Settlement, Oktyabrsky District, Volgograd Oblast, Russia. The population was 190 as of 2010. There are 4 streets.

Geography 
Verkhnekumsky is located in steppe, on Yergeni, 29 km northwest of Oktyabrsky (the district's administrative centre) by road. Sovetsky is the nearest rural locality.

References 

Rural localities in Oktyabrsky District, Volgograd Oblast